The 47th Indian Infantry Brigade was an Infantry formation of the Indian Army during World War II. The brigade was formed October 1942, at Secunderabad in India and assigned to the 19th Indian Infantry Division. In March 1942, it was transferred to the 14th Indian Infantry Division.

Formation
1st Battalion, 7th Rajput Regiment October 1941 to May 1943
5th Battalion, 8th Punjab Regiment October 1941 to June 1943
2nd Battalion, 1st Punjab Regiment October 1941 to September 1942
1st Battalion, Royal Inniskilling Fusiliers October 1942 to July 1943
MG Battalion, 9th Jat Regiment January to February 1943
7th Battalion, 13th Frontier Force Rifles July 1943 to August 1945
14th Battalion, 11th Sikh Regiment July 1943 to August 1945
15th Battalion, 10th Baluch Regiment August 1943 to August 1945

See also

 List of Indian Army Brigades in World War II

References

British Indian Army brigades
Military units and formations in Burma in World War II